Disappointment Lake is an Alpine lake located in the John Muir Wilderness, which is part of the Sierra Nevada mountain range. The lake is found by following the Hell for Sure Trail which continues up to Hell for Sure Lake and Hell for Sure Pass.

Nearby Lakes 
Disappointment Lake is part of the Red Mountain basin of which there are a few lakes including Hell for Sure Lake, Horseshoe Lake, and Devil's Punchbowl.

See also 

 List of lakes in California

References 

Lakes of the Sierra Nevada (United States)